The Berlin Thunder are an American football team in Berlin, Germany. They play in the European League of Football (ELF) northern conference.

History 
On 22 March 2021, the Berlin Thunder were announced as one of the eight teams to play in the inaugural season of the European League of Football.

Their first game was against the Leipzig Kings on 20 June 2021.

After the 2021 season the contract of head coach Jag Bal wasn't extended. On September 12, 2021 it was announced that former NFL 1st-round draft pick Björn Werner became co-owner and director of football operations of the franchise. Shortly after, then general manager Heiko von Glahn left the franchise and was succeeded by the first female general manager of the league with Diana Hoge. With the announcement of the new head coach Johnny Schmuck, all important positions in the Berlin front office have been changed.

Season-by-season

Stadium 
In their first season, the Thunder played the first two home games at Amateurstadion Olympiapark, and the other three at Friedrich-Ludwig-Jahn-Sportpark. For the entire 2022 season the Jahn-Sportpark-Stadium will be their venue for home games.

Roster

Staff

References

External links
 Official website

American football teams in Germany
Sport in Berlin
 
2021 establishments in Germany
American football teams established in 2021
European League of Football teams